Ronald "Ron“ Mark Solomon (b. 15 December 1948) is an American mathematician specializing in the theory of finite groups.

Solomon studied as an undergraduate at Queens College and received a PhD in 1971 at Yale University under Walter Feit with a thesis entitled Finite Groups with Sylow 2-Subgroups of the Type of the Alternating Group on Twelve Letters. In 1972, he began his participation in the classification program for finite simple groups, after hearing a lecture by Daniel Gorenstein. He was for two years an instructor at the University of Chicago and the academic year 1974–1975 at Rutgers University, before he became a professor at Ohio State University, where he has remained. In 2006, he received the Levi L. Conant Prize and in 2012 the Leroy P. Steele Prize. In 2012, he was elected a Fellow of the American Mathematical Society.

With Gorenstein and Richard Lyons he wrote a series of six volumes on the classification program for finite simple groups in the context of a project for the examination of the proof.

Works 
 with Daniel Gorenstein, Richard Lyons: The classification of the finite simple groups, American Mathematical Society, 6 Volumes, 1994–2005
 Solomon "A brief history of the classification of finite simple groups", Bull. of the AMS, Vol.38, No. 3, 2001, pdf file (paper that won the Conant Prize for 2006)
 Abstract algebra, Belmont/California, Thompson Brooks/Cole 2003

References

External links 
 Homepage
  Announcement of Conant Prizes for 2006, pdf File
 

20th-century American mathematicians
21st-century American mathematicians
1948 births
Group theorists
Yale University alumni
Ohio State University faculty
Living people
Fellows of the American Mathematical Society